Al-Hashd Al-Shaabi Sport Club, is an Iraqi football team based in Baghdad, that plays in the Iraq Division Three.

Managerial history
 Raad Kadhim

See also
 2021–22 Iraq FA Cup

References

External links
 Al-Hashd Al-Shaabi SC on Goalzz.com
 Iraq Clubs- Foundation Dates

Football clubs in Iraq
2020 establishments in Iraq
Association football clubs established in 2020
Football clubs in Baghdad